The 2003 Anchorage mayoral election was held on April 1, 2003, to elect the mayor of Anchorage, Alaska. It saw election of Mark Begich, who unseated incumbent mayor George Wuerch.

An assembly ordinance and ballot proposition passed in Anchorage in 2003 had lowered the threshold required to avoid a mayoral runoff from 50% of the vote to 45%. Since Begich surpassed this margin, no runoff was necessary.

Candidates
Mark Begich, former Anchorage Assemblyman,  1994 and 2000 mayoral candidate
Jennifer Citti
Daniel DeNardo
David Dunsmore
Thomas Mark Higgins
Tom Layne
Bruce J. Lemke
Ray Malcolm
Rick Mystrom, former mayor
George Wuerch, incumbent mayor
Richard Zeigler, 1994 mayoral candidate

Results

References 

Anchorage
Anchorage 
2003
Mark Begich